Rise is the third album by American supergroup Revolution Saints. It was released on January 24, 2020, via Neapolitan label Frontiers and it was produced by Italian multi-instrumentalist Alessandro Del Vecchio, also involved songwriting, keyboards and backing vocals, as in the two previous albums.

This album includes the ex-Night by Night singer Dan Rossall as a songwriter.

The first single released was When the Heartache Has Gone on December 12, 2019, followed by Closer on January 10, 2020.

Track listing

Personnel
Deen Castronovo – drums, vocals
Doug Aldrich – guitars
Jack Blades – bass guitar, vocals

Additional personnel
Alessandro Del Vecchio – producing, recording, mixing, mastering, keyboards, backing vocals
Serafino Perugino – executive producer
Luna Akire – vocals on "Talk to Me" 
Andrea Seveso – studio assistant
Oleg "Voodoo" Shcherbakov – artwork, layout, design

Charts

See also
List of 2020 albums

References

2020 albums
Revolution Saints albums
Frontiers Records albums